The Roman Catholic Diocese of Broken Bay is a suffragan Latin Rite diocese of the Archdiocese of Sydney, covering the North Shore and Northern Beaches of greater metropolitan Sydney, and the Broken Bay and Central Coast regions of New South Wales, Australia.

On 20 November 2014 Bishop Peter Comensoli was appointed as the third bishop of the diocese.  He was enthroned on 12 December 2014. Bishop Comensoli was elevated to the position of Archbishop of Melbourne in June 2018 and was replaced by Bishop Anthony Randazzo as the fourth bishop of the diocese in November 2019.

History
The Diocese of Broken Bay was erected on 8 April 1986. Prior to this date, the area was considered within the jurisdiction of the Archdiocese of Sydney.

According to Roman Catholic Church records, in 1822 Governor Brisbane granted  land near Pittwater to Father Therry for the purposes of establishing a church. However, attempts to established a church in 1859 were postponed due to the sparcity of Catholics. A church at Manly was established in 1873 and another erected at Careel Bay in 1875. Manly was the site of the first parish that was established in the area in 1876; followed by Gosford (1888) and Pymble (1889). Together these three parishes covered most of the present diocese until 1910. By 1885, work on St Patrick's College, Manly had commenced and was completed in 1888.

Symbolising the diocese is the lighthouse, based on the historic lighthouse at Barrenjoey.

Bishops of Broken Bay
The following individuals have been elected as Bishop of Broken Bay:
{| class="wikitable"
!Order
!Name
!Date installed
!Term ended
!Term of office
!Reason for term end
|-
|align="center"| ||Patrick Laurence Murphy ||align="center" | 8 April 1986 ||align="center" |9 July 1996 ||align="right"| ||Resigned and appointed Bishop Emeritus of Broken Bay
|-
|align="center"| ||David Louis Walker ||align="center" |9 July 1996 ||align="center" |11 November 2013 ||align="right"| || Resigned and appointed Bishop Emeritus of Broken Bay
|-
|align="center"| ||Peter Comensoli ||align="center" |12 December 2014 ||align="center" |1 August 2018 ||align="right"| || Appointed Archbishop of Melbourne
|-
|align="center"| ||Anthony Randazzo ||align="center" |7 October 2019 ||align="center" | present ||align="right"| || (incumbent)

|}

Cathedral
On 10 February 2008 Our Lady of the Rosary, Waitara, was inaugurated as the cathedral of the diocese, succeeding Corpus Christi, the parish church of St Ives.

Derivative agencies and offices 
The Diocese of Broken Bay operates a number of agencies and offices to manage various functions of the Diocese such as Catholic outreach and evangelism, family support, disability support, and education.
 Office for Safeguarding and Professional Standards (Chancery) responsible for the administration and management of professional standards, child protection, and safeguarding responsibilities within the Diocese.
 CatholicCare (Diocese of Broken Bay) belonging to Catholic Social Services Australia responsible for the provision and administration of services for families, children, and people with disabilities as well as foster care and out-of-home services.
 Catholic Development Fund (CDF) responsible for the management of funds belonging to the Diocese and acts as its official treasury service for funds to religious, charitable, and educational services. The CDF is considered a charitable institution under the Australian Taxation Office's definitions.
 Office of Evangelisation responsible for Catholic outreach and the promotion of the Diocese as well as individual parishes, members, and communities.
 Catholic Schools Office responsible for the administration and oversight of private Catholic schools within the Diocese, currently 44 in total (36 primary schools and 8 high schools).
 Bishop David L Walker Library responsible for the provision and management of information resources, especially that relating to Roman Catholicism and relevant teachings.

Parishes

Arcadia (St Benedict)
Carlingford (St Gerard) and Epping (Our Lady Help of Christians)
Chatswood (Our Lady of Dolours)
Frenchs Forest – combining the parishes of Davidson (St Martin de Porres), Forestville (Our Lady of Good Counsel), and Terrey Hills (St Anthony in the Fields)
Gosford (St Patrick)
Hornsby – combining the parishes of Waitara Cathedral (Our Lady of the Rosary) and Normanhurst (Queen of Peace)
Kincumber (Holy Cross)
Ku-ring-gai Chase – combining the parishes of Asquith (St Patrick), Berowra (St Bernard), and Brooklyn (Peace Chapel)
The Lakes – combining the parishes of Collaroy Plateau (St Rose) and Narrabeen (St Joseph)
Lindfield-Killara – combining the parishes of Killara (Immaculate Heart of Mary) and Lindfield (Holy Family)
Lower North Shore – combining the parishes of Naremburn (St Leonard), Northbridge (St Philip Neri), and Willoughby (St Thomas)
Manly Freshwater – combining the parishes of Harbord (St John the Baptist) and Manly (Mary Immaculate & St Athanasius)
North Harbour – combining the parishes of Balgowlah (St Cecilia) and Manly Vale (St Kieran)
Pennant Hills (St Agatha)

Pittwater – combining the parishes of Avalon (Maria Regina) and Mona Vale (Sacred Heart)
Pymble (Sacred Heart) and West Pymble (Our Lady of Perpetual Succour) 
St Ives (Corpus Christi)
Terrigal (Our Lady Star of the Sea)
The Entrance (Our Lady of the Rosary)
Toukley (St Mary)
Warringah – combining the parishes of Dee Why (St Kevin) and Narraweena (St John, Apostle & Evangelist)
Wahroonga (Holy Name)
Warnervale (St Mary of the Cross MacKillop)
Willoughby (St Thomas)
Woy Woy (St John the Baptist)
Wyoming (Our Lady of the Rosary)
Wyong (St Cecilia)

Catholic Schools Office of the Diocese
 the Diocese was responsible for overseeing the management of 43 Schools in the area (36 Catholic primary schools and 7 Catholic high schools) and was made up of approximately 15,000 students. The schools in the Diocese are:
Primary

Corpus Christi Catholic Primary School, St Ives
Holy Cross Catholic Primary School, Kincumber
Holy Family Catholic Primary School, Lindfield
Maria Regina Catholic Primary School, Avalon
Our Lady Help of Christians Catholic Primary School, Epping
Our Lady of Dolours Catholic Primary School, Chatswood
Our Lady of Good Counsel Catholic Primary School, Forestville
Our Lady of Perpetual Succour Catholic Primary School, West Pymble
Our Lady of the Rosary Catholic Primary School, Waitara
Our Lady of the Rosary Catholic Primary School, Shelly Beach
Our Lady of the Rosary Catholic Primary School, Wyoming
Our Lady Star of the Sea Catholic Primary School, Terrigal
Prouille Catholic Primary School, Wahroonga
Sacred Heart Catholic Primary School, Mona Vale
Sacred Heart Catholic Primary School, Pymble
St Agatha's Catholic Primary School, Pennant Hills
St Bernard's Catholic Primary School, Berowra Heights
St Brendan's Catholic Primary School, Lake Munmorah

St Cecilia's Catholic Primary School, Balgowlah
St Cecilia's Catholic Primary School, Wyong
St Gerard's Catholic Primary School, Carlingford
St John Fisher Catholic Primary School, Tumbi Umbi
St John the Baptist Catholic Primary School, Freshwater
St John the Baptist Catholic Primary School, Woy Woy South
St John's Catholic Primary School, Narraweena
St Joseph's Catholic Primary School, Narrabeen
St Kevin's Catholic Primary School, Dee Why
St Kieran's Catholic Primary School, Manly Vale
St Martin's Catholic Primary School, Davidson
St Mary's Catholic Primary School, Manly
St Mary's Catholic Primary School, Noraville
St Patrick's Catholic Primary School, Asquith
St Patrick's Catholic Primary School, East Gosford
St Philip Neri Catholic Primary School, Northbridge
St Rose Catholic Primary School, Collaroy Plateau
St Thomas' Catholic Primary School, Willoughby

Secondary
Mater Maria Catholic College (Co-ed), Warriewood
Mercy Catholic College (Girls), Chatswood
St Joseph's Catholic College (Girls), East Gosford
St Leo's Catholic College (Co-ed), Wahroonga
St Paul's Catholic College (Boys), Manly
St Peter's Catholic College (Co-ed), Tuggerah

Primary & Secondary
MacKillop Catholic College (Co-ed), Warnervale

See also

Roman Catholicism in Australia
Patricia Madigan

References

External links
Diocese of Broken Bay

 
Roman Catholic Ecclesiastical Province of Sydney
Broken Bay
Broken Bay
Broken Bay
Broken Bay